CDKN2B-AS, also known as ANRIL (antisense non-coding RNA in the INK4 locus) is a long non-coding RNA consisting of 19 exons, spanning 126.3kb in the genome, and its spliced product is a 3834bp RNA. It is located within the p15/CDKN2B-p16/CDKN2A-p14/ARF gene cluster, in the antisense direction. Single nucleotide polymorphisms (SNPs) which alter the expression of CDKN2B-AS are associated with human healthy life expectancy, as well as with multiple diseases, including coronary artery disease, diabetes and many cancers. It binds to chromobox 7 (CBX7) within the polycomb repressive complex 1 and to SUZ12, a component of polycomb repression complex 2 and through these interactions is involved in transcriptional repression.

See also 
 Long noncoding RNA

References

Further reading

External links 
 
 
 

Non-coding RNA